Live Life Fast (stylized in all caps) is the second studio album by American rapper Roddy Ricch. It was released on December 17, 2021, through Atlantic Records and Bird Vision Entertainment. The album features guest appearances from Future, Kodak Black, 21 Savage, Takeoff, Jamie Foxx, Ty Dolla Sign, Alex Isley, Fivio Foreign, Lil Baby, and Gunna. The production was handled by multiple producers including Wheezy,  Boi-1da, Southside, TM88 and Kenny Beats among others.

Live Life Fast was preceded by one single, "Late at Night", which was released on June 4, 2021. The album received generally lukewarm reviews from music critics and received moderate commercial success. It debuted at number four on the US Billboard 200 chart, earning 62,000 album-equivalent units (including 3,500 copies in pure album sales) in its first week.

Background and promotion
In August 2020, Ricch announced that he was working on his second studio album, in which he called it a "masterpiece" and also said that he was waiting for the right time to release it. In September 2021, he posted a screenshot of the album name alongside the number of tracks and its duration through an Instagram story. Ricch also revealed a list of featured artists and some record producers who contribute to the album on December 14, 2021. He announced that fans would get to hear the album early as he would go to different cities and play songs from it. The album's lead and only single, "Late at Night", was previously released on June 4, 2021.

Critical reception

Live Life Fast was met with generally positive reviews from music critics. At Metacritic, which assigns a normalized rating out of 100 to reviews from professional publications, the album received an average score of 67, based on six reviews.

Commercial performance
Live Life Fast debuted at number four on the US Billboard 200 chart, earning 62,000 album-equivalent units (including 3,500 copies in pure album sales) in its first week. This became Roddy Ricch's second US top-ten debut on the chart. The album also accumulated a total of 76.51 million on-demand streams from the album's songs.

Track listing

Notes
 All tracks are stylized in lowercase. For example, "Late at Night" is stylized as "late at night".
 "LLF" features uncredited background vocals from Ty Dolla Sign.
 "Bibi's Interlude" features uncredited vocals from Bibi Bourelly.

Charts

References

2021 albums
Roddy Ricch albums
Albums produced by Southside (record producer)
Albums produced by Ronny J
Albums produced by Wheezy
Albums produced by Boi-1da
Albums produced by TM88
Albums produced by DJ Mustard